Billy Joe Gibson (June 28, 1919October 19, 2002) was an American football defensive back and end in the National Football League for the Cleveland Rams (1942, 1944) and the Washington Redskins (1943).  Gibson also played in the All-America Football Conference for the Brooklyn Dodgers.  He played college football at the University of Tulsa.

1919 births
2002 deaths
People from Nocona, Texas
Players of American football from Texas
American football defensive backs
American football wide receivers
Tulsa Golden Hurricane football players
Cleveland Rams players
Washington Redskins players
Brooklyn Dodgers (AAFC) players